Moraea hexaglottis is a species of plant in the family Iridaceae. It is endemic to Namibia.  Its natural habitat is subtropical or tropical dry shrubland.

References

Flora of Namibia
hexaglottis
Least concern plants
Taxonomy articles created by Polbot